Lac-Delage is a town in the Capitale-Nationale region of Quebec, Canada, located on the eponymous Lake Delage.

Demographics 

Mother tongue:
 English as first language: 1.3%
 French as first language: 92.9%
 English and French as first language: 1.9%
 Other as first language: 2.6%

Local government

Lac-Delage forms part of the federal electoral district of Portneuf—Jacques-Cartier and has been represented by Joël Godin of the Conservative Party since 2015. Provincially, Lac-Delage is part of the Chauveau electoral district and is represented by Sylvain Lévesque of the Coalition Avenir Québec since 2018.

Municipal council
 Mayor: Guy Rochette
 Councillors: Jannys Landry, Alexandre Morin, Marc Boiteau, Isabelle Coulombe, Christiane Gosselin, Jonathan Baker

See also
List of cities in Quebec

References

Incorporated places in Capitale-Nationale
Cities and towns in Quebec